Julio Meneghello Rivera (1911 – 15 August 2009) was a Chilean physician, scientist, academic, and researcher, considered the initiator of social pediatrics in his country.

Biography
Julio Meneghello obtained his professional degree in 1936 at the University of Chile. Between 1941 and 1943 he did postgraduate studies at the American universities Harvard, Johns Hopkins, and Cornell.

He is considered the father of modern pediatrics in the country, among other things, because he was the first in the world – around 1955 – to put into practice the systematized use of oral serums to treat acute diarrhea with great dehydration in malnourished children. In addition, he and his team found the ideal composition of these hydrating serums, which (with certain modifications) would be recommended by entities such as the World Health Organization and UNICEF for the management of these minors.

The importance of this scientific and pedagogical work was recognized by the medical journal The Lancet in 1978, as one of the most important medical advances of the 20th century for developing countries.

In 1995 Meneghello received the Rector Juvenal Hernández Jaque Medal, awarded by the University of Chile to those members of their community who, in the exercise of their professions, have rendered distinguished services.

In 1996 he received Chile's National Prize for Applied Sciences and Technologies for his contribution to eradicating malnutrition and reducing infant mortality in the country.

In 2002 he was awarded his country's National Prize for Medicine.

Julio Meneghello died of pneumonia in Santiago on 15 August 2009, at age 98.

References

1911 births
2009 deaths
Academic staff of the University of Chile
Chilean people of Italian descent
Chilean pediatricians
Cornell University alumni
Deaths from pneumonia in Chile
Harvard University alumni
Johns Hopkins University alumni
Medical educators
University of Chile alumni
20th-century Chilean physicians
21st-century Chilean physicians